This is a list of Southern Jaguars football players in the NFL Draft.

Key

Selections

References

Southern

Southern Jaguars NFL Draft